{{DISPLAYTITLE:Adenosine A2 receptor}}
Two subtypes of adenosine A2 receptors are known. Both are G protein-coupled adenosine receptors:

 Adenosine A2A receptor
 Adenosine A2B receptor